Beijing Guoan Superleague Formula team is the racing team of Beijing Guoan, a football team that competes in China in the Chinese Super League. The Beijing Guoan racing team competes in the Superleague Formula. They are operated by Alan Docking Racing. They would not return until 2010.

2008 season
In the 2008 Superleague Formula season Beijing Guoan were declared the champions after finishing 1st overall with 413 points. Italian driver Davide Rigon was the Beijing driver for all rounds.

In the 2008 Donington Park round Beijing secured pole for the first race, and went on to set the fastest lap in the first race and win it.

Beijing Guoan's only retirement was at the 2008 Zolder round in race 1 where they collided with A.C. Milan (Robert Doornbos) at the first corner. Thanks to the reverse grid format, they won the 2nd race at Zolder. Their last race win was the first race of the 2008 Vallelunga round where they also set the fastest lap.

2010
In May 2010 it was announced that Beijing would return to Superleague. They had missed the opening round at Silverstone. John Martin was the driver. At Jarama the team took the first pole and won the first race. The team would score five more race wins during the season and finishing ninth in the final standings.

Record
(key)

2008

2010

References

External links
 Beijing Guoan Superleague Formula team minisite
 Official Beijing Guoan football club website

Beijing Guoan F.C.
Superleague Formula club teams
2008 establishments in China